Kilb is a town in the district of Melk in the Austrian state of Lower Austria.

Geography
Kilb lies in the foothills of the Alps on the Sierning River, which has its source in the municipality. About 25.93 percent of the municipality is forested.

References

Cities and towns in Melk District